The silver shiner (Notropis photogenis) is a species of ray-finned fish in the genus Notropis. It is found in the United States and Canada where it inhabits much of the Ohio River basin south to northern Georgia in the Tennessee River drainage. It also found in western Lake Erie tributaries and the Grand River system in Ontario. Though visually very similar to the emerald shiner, which occupies a similar range, it can be distinguished by the presence of two dark crescents between its nostrils, on the top of the head.

References 

 

Notropis
Fish described in 1865